Beehive is an unincorporated community within Perry County, Kentucky, United States.

References

Unincorporated communities in Perry County, Kentucky
Unincorporated communities in Kentucky